The President of the First Chamber of the States of the Grand Duchy of Hesse was the presiding officer of the upper chamber of that legislature.

Footnotes

Sources
Ruppell, Hans Georg and Groß, Birgit: Hessische Abgeordnete 1820-1930, Düsseldorf 1980 

Political history of Germany
Hesse